Faustino Bretaño (1895–1978) was a Spanish film actor.

Selected filmography
 Currito of the Cross (1926)
 Lola Leaves for the Ports (1947)
 The Troublemaker (1950)
 Agustina of Aragon (1950)
 Dawn of America (1951)
 The Lioness of Castille (1951)
 Good News (1954)

References

Bibliography
 Goble, Alan. The Complete Index to Literary Sources in Film. Walter de Gruyter, 1999.

External links

1895 births
1978 deaths
Spanish male film actors
Spanish male silent film actors
20th-century Spanish male actors